James Alonzo Bishop (November 21, 1907 – July 26, 1987) was an American journalist and author who wrote the bestselling book The Day Lincoln was Shot.

Early life
Born in Jersey City, New Jersey, he dropped out of school after eighth grade. In 1923, he studied typing, shorthand, and bookkeeping, and in 1929 began work as a copy boy at the New York Daily News.

Career
In 1930, Bishop got a job as a cub reporter at New York Daily Mirror, where he worked until 1943, when he joined Collier's magazine. He remained there until 1945.

His plans to write for his friend and mentor, Hollywood producer Mark Hellinger, ended with Hellinger's death in 1947. Bishop wrote a biography of Hellinger in 1952.

From 1946 to 1948, Bishop was executive editor of Liberty magazine, he then was director of the literary department at the Music Corporation of America until 1951. Next, he was the founding editor of Gold Medal Books (the juvenile division of Fawcett Publications) until 1953.

In the 1950s, Bishop would do his writing at the Jersey Shore in Sea Bright, New Jersey, going back to his home in Teaneck, New Jersey on weekends to see his wife and children. In 1957, he started his column, Jim Bishop: Reporter, with King Features Syndicate, which continued until 1983. It also landed him on the master list of Nixon political opponents.

Bishop spent the remainder of his career writing biographical books about notable figures and Christian-themed books.

Bishop's book The Day Lincoln Was Shot was published in 1955.  Bishop had worked on the book for 24 years. The book was successful, selling more than 3 million copies, and it was translated into 16 languages.

Bishop also wrote The Day Christ Died (1957), The Day Christ Was Born (1960), and The Day Kennedy Was Shot (1968). Perhaps his most critically acclaimed book was FDR's Last Year: April 1944 – April 1945 (1974), which brought to public awareness the secrecy that surrounded President Franklin D. Roosevelt's declining health during World War II.

An autobiography, A Bishop's Confession, was published in 1981.

Writing in Crisis Magazine sixty years after the publication of The Day Christ Died, Michael De Sapio offers these words of admiration for the author:Jim Bishop was at heart a Catholic who believed in the veracity of the Gospels. There is no biblical revisionism here, no reductive attempts to purge the miraculous out of scripture.

Bishop died of respiratory failure on 26 July 1987 at his home in Delray Beach, Florida.

Screen adaptations
The Day Lincoln Was Shot was dramatized on TV twice, first as a 1956 live special starring Raymond Massey as Abraham Lincoln and shown on the Ford Star Jubilee anthology series, and again as a 1998 TNT made-for-television film starring Lance Henriksen as Lincoln.

The Day Christ Died was made into a television film in 1980, starring Chris Sarandon as Jesus Christ, and Keith Michell as Pontius Pilate.

References

External links

 
 Jim Bishop Chronology by Michael Spencer
 Jim Bishop Collection at St. Bonaventure University

1907 births
1987 deaths
American male biographers
Deaths from respiratory failure
People from Teaneck, New Jersey
Writers from Florida
Writers from New Jersey
Writers from New York City
20th-century American biographers
20th-century American male writers
Historians from New York (state)
Fawcett Publications